1 Corinthians 10 is the tenth chapter of the First Epistle to the Corinthians in the New Testament of the Christian Bible. It is authored by Paul the Apostle and Sosthenes in Ephesus. In this chapter Paul writes about the Corinthians' Exodus journey and the Eucharist, and returns to the subject of food offered to idols. The argument concerning meats offered to idols is resumed in 1 Corinthians 10:14.

Text
Originally written in Koine Greek, this chapter is divided into 33 verses.

Textual witnesses
Some early manuscripts containing the text of this chapter are:
Papyrus 129 (mid 2nd century; extant verses 1–6)
Codex Vaticanus (AD 325–350)
Codex Sinaiticus (330–360)
Codex Alexandrinus (400–440)
Codex Ephraemi Rescriptus (~450; complete).
Codex Freerianus (~450; extant verses 29)
Codex Claromontanus (~550)
Codex Coislinianus (~550; extant verses 22–29)

Old Testament references
 1 Corinthians 10:28 references Psalm 24

Old Testament examples against idolatry (10:1–14)
The Pulpit Commentary suggests that Paul's purpose in verses 1 to 14 is to warn "against over confidence in relation to idolatry and other temptations".

Although writing to a church made up of both Jews and gentiles, Paul finds no difficulty in using scriptural narratives to illustrate God's dealings with the church, since he regards the Israelites in the desert as "our ancestors" (10:1) or "our fathers", that is, the [Jewish] forefathers at the time of the exodus from Egypt. He speaks, "as in Romans 4:1, from his national consciousness, which was shared in by his Jewish readers, and well understood by his Gentile ones". Paul emphasises that all of "our fathers" had the blessing of the divine presence:  ("all") has strong emphasis, and is repeated four times. Paul uses the story of Israel's disobedience in the wilderness (also concerning idolatry and sexual immorality which makes it immediately relevant) to illustrate his warning to the Corinthians: "even those chosen by God can go badly astray; and if they do, whatever their privileges are liable to destruction".

Verse 13

"No temptation has overtaken you" (NKJV; KJV: "There hath no temptation taken you"): Gill suggests that this statement is to comfort the believers, so they will not be distressed or regard it as "some strange or unusual thing" or that they "must unavoidably perish and be destroyed by it."
"Common to man": can be rendered as "is humane" or "suited to man" which is explained further as "a temptation which one is able to bear". Paul does not mean that "they had been, or were, or would be entirely free from other temptations", but that the temptation might be endured while the believers are strengthened by the grace of God.
"God [...] will not allow you to be tempted beyond what you are able": the believers are tempted, afflicted, or persecuted, only by a "divine permission", and within the determination of God, who also provide strength and always be with them until the end.
"The way of escape": Gill wrote that God knows how and when to deliver his people out of temptations, while also, "in His providence, open a way that they may escape out of them."
"You may be able to bear it": or "what you are in a position to bear" (cf. 1 Corinthians 3:2). According to Gill, God "does not always think fit to remove at once an affliction or temptation", although being asked earnestly by his people, as in the case of Paul himself (1 Corinthians 12:7–8), but he provides them grace enough to bear it or "stand up under it" and "triumph over it."

The inherent disgracefulness of any tampering with idolatry (10:15–22)
At the Lord's Supper, "the cup of blessing" is a "partnership" in the blood of Christ and similarly, "the bread which is broken" is a symbol of "partnership" in the body of Christ (10:16), so that the participation in this meal signals a bond between the participant and Christ, which must be exclusive of all others (10:21-2; cf. the parallel argumentation in 6:15-17).

The reference to the 'bread' and the 'body' leads to an exposition about the 'one body' of the church (10:17, anticipating 11:17-34 and 12:12-31), as a model to encourage the people to take more care of their fellow 'limbs' with weaker consciences (cf. 10:23—4).

Verse 16

"The cup of blessing": translated from Hebrew:  (cf. Psalm 116:13: , -, "cup of salvation"), that is, toward the end of the Passover celebration, a blessing was invoked by the head of the family over this cup. Here, the name is transferred to the "chalice in the Eucharist", over which Christ "gave thanks" (1 Corinthians 11:24; Matthew 26:27). A close connection is observed between the "blessing" (Matthew 26:22; Mark 14:22) and "giving thanks" (Luke 22:19).
"The bread" or rather, "the loaf", was "apparently passed from hand to hand", that each participant "might break off a piece". The best comment on the verse is John 6:41-59, where Jesus taught that "there could be no true spiritual life without the closest union with him and incorporation into his life". 
"The communion of": literally, "a participation in".

Verse 17

"For we are all partakers of one bread": or linguistically can be rendered as "for we all have a share from the one bread".

Practical guidelines on eating and avoiding offence (10:23–33)
This part, concluding in 11:1, deals with the ban on participation in 'idolatry' in 'places and occasions where sacrificial food may be on offer without involving the believer in idolatry'. As in chapter 8, Paul maintains that "love is a more valuable criterion than knowledge" (8:1—3), so when acknowledging again the Corinthian principle of freedom (10:23, cf. 6:12), Paul insists on what "builds up", that is, "what is beneficial to others" (cf. 8:1).

See also 
 Crossing the Red Sea
 Idolatry in Christianity
 Last Supper
 Pillar of Cloud
 Related Bible parts: Exodus 13, Exodus 14, Exodus 16, Psalm 66, Psalm 105, Romans 8, Ephesians 6, Colossians 1, James 1, 1 Peter 1.

References

Sources

Further reading

External links 
 King James Bible - Wikisource
English Translation with Parallel Latin Vulgate
Online Bible at GospelHall.org (ESV, KJV, Darby, American Standard Version, Bible in Basic English)
Multiple bible versions at Bible Gateway (NKJV, NIV, NRSV etc.)

10